Drive Image (PQDI) is a software disk cloning package for Intel-based computers.  The software was developed and distributed by the former PowerQuest Corporation.  Drive Image version 7 became the basis for Norton Ghost 9.0, which was released to retail markets in August 2004.  Ghost was a competing product, developed by Binary Research, before Symantec bought the company in 1998. This also explains the different file extensions used for Ghost image files: formerly it was .gho, now in versions 9.0 and above it is .v2i.

Product history 
Drive Image version 7 was the last version published under the PowerQuest corporate banner.  It was also the first version to include a native Windows interface for cloning an active system partition; prior versions required a reboot into a DOS-like environment in order to clone the active partition.  In order to clone active partitions without requiring a reboot, Drive Image 7 employed a volume snapshot device driver which was licensed from StorageCraft Technology Corporation.

Drive Image 2002 (version 6) is the last release that allows the creation of a rescue set on floppy disk, which can be used to create and restore an image.

See also
List of disk cloning software

References

External links 
 Symantec Corporation website
 Drive Image v7 review by PCWorld

Storage software
Gen Digital software